The Juche Tower (more formally, the Tower of the Juche Idea), completed in 1982, is a monument in Pyongyang, the capital of North Korea, and is named after the ideology of Juche introduced by the country's first leader, Kim Il-sung.

Background 
The Juche Tower is situated on the east bank of the River Taedong, directly opposite Kim Il-sung Square on the west bank. It was built to commemorate Kim Il-sung's 70th birthday. Although his son and successor Kim Jong-il is officially credited as its designer, interviews with North Korean former officials contradict this assertion.

The architectural style of the Tower is inspired by stone pagodas of premodern Korea. The  structure is a four-sided tapering  spirethe tallest in granitecontaining 25,550 blocks (365 × 70: one for each day of Kim Il-sung's life, excluding supplementary days for leap years), dressed in white stone with seventy dividers and capped with a -high 45-ton illuminated metal torch.

The torch on top of the tower is always lit. It is possible to ascend the tower by elevator and there are wide views over Pyongyang from the viewing platform just below the torch.

At its base, there are reception rooms where videos explaining the tower's ideological importance are sometimes shown. The Juche Tower is the second tallest monumental column in the world after the San Jacinto Monument in Texas, United States, which is  taller.

Associated with the tower is a -high statue consisting of three idealised figures each holding a toola hammer (the worker); a sickle (the peasant); and a writing brush (the "working intellectual")in a classic Stalinistic-style reminiscent of the Soviet statue Worker and Kolkhoz Woman. The three tools form the emblem of the ruling Workers' Party of Korea.

A wall carrying 82 friendship plaques from foreign supporters and Juche study groups forms part of the Tower.

Gallery

See also 
 Monas, a similarly designed monument-tower in Jakarta, Indonesia, topped with flame statue and elevator ride to the top observation deck
 Washington Monument in Washington DC, United States, an obelisk erected to commemorate George Washington
 San Jacinto Monument near La Porte, Texas, United States, the world's tallest masonry column to commemorate the Battle of San Jacinto
 Monument to Party Founding
 Arch of Triumph (Pyongyang)
 Arch of Reunification

References

External links 

 Asian Historical Architecture: Juche Tower
 Virtual tour of Juche Tower

1982 establishments in North Korea
Towers completed in 1982
Buildings and structures in Pyongyang
Monuments and memorials in North Korea
National symbols of North Korea
Towers in North Korea
Tourist attractions in Pyongyang
Monumental columns in North Korea
Articles containing video clips
20th-century architecture in North Korea